Bryan Verboom (born 30 January 1992) is a Belgian footballer who plays as left back. He is a former Belgium U21 international.

Career

Early career
Verboom started his career at Sporting Charleroi before joining Anderlecht.

Zulte Waregem
He joined Zulte Waregem on loan in 2012. He played his first official match the 27 October 2012 against Waasland-Beveren and scored his first goal against Sporting Charleroi a few days later. During his loan spell he scored 1 goal in 20 games during an impressive loan spell.

Zulte-Waregem exercised their loan option to sign Verboom and signed Verboom on a permanent deal from Anderlecht in 2013. He helped Zulte-Waregem to a second-place finish in the Belgian League to help them qualify for The Champions League in his first season at the club, however they were knocked out by Dutch side PSV Eindhoven as a result Waregem dropped in the UEFA Europa League. During the 2013/14 season, Verboom finished runner up in the Belgian Cup Final after losing to Lokeren in a 1–0 defeat.

Verboom's impressive form at left back also saw Waregem qualify for the 2014–15 UEFA Europa League qualifiers also.

International career
Verboom was born in Belgium and is of Congolese descent. Verboom was capped by Belgium U21s in 2012.

Honours 
Belgian Pro League:
Runners-up: 2012–13
Belgian Cup:
Runners-up: 2013–14

References

External links

1992 births
Living people
Belgian footballers
Belgian expatriate footballers
Belgium under-21 international footballers
Belgian people of Democratic Republic of the Congo descent
R. Charleroi S.C. players
R.S.C. Anderlecht players
S.V. Zulte Waregem players
Roda JC Kerkrade players
K.V. Kortrijk players
UR La Louvière Centre players
FC Aarau players
Belgian Pro League players
Eredivisie players
Belgian Third Division players
Swiss Challenge League players
People from Anderlecht
Association football defenders
Belgian expatriate sportspeople in the Netherlands
Belgian expatriate sportspeople in Switzerland
Expatriate footballers in the Netherlands
Expatriate footballers in Switzerland
RWDM47 players
Field hockey players from Brussels